American country music artist Barbara Mandrell has won over 39 awards and has been nominated for more than 35. She has received nine nominations from the Academy of Country Music and has won six accolades from the association. For winning the Top New Female Vocalist, Top Female Vocalist and Entertainer of the Year awards, Mandrell was given the Triple Crown accolade in 2005. From the Country Music Association, she has been nominated 17 times and has won four awards. This includes winning back-to-back Entertainer of the Year trophies in the early 1980s. In addition, she has also won two Grammy awards for her work in the gospel field. In the 1980s, she was given nine People's Choice Awards.

Academy of Country Music Awards

!
|-
| 1970
| Barbara Mandrell
| Most Promising Female Vocalist
| 
| align="center" rowspan="15"| 
|-
| 1978
| Barbara Mandrell
| Top Female Vocalist
| 
|-
| 1979
| Barbara Mandrell
| Top Female Vocalist
| 
|-
| rowspan="2"| 1980
| Barbara Mandrell
| Entertainer of the Year
| 
|-
| Barbara Mandrell
| Top Female Vocalist
| 
|-
| rowspan="3"| 1981
| Barbara Mandrell
| Top Female Vocalist
| 
|-
| Barbara Mandrell
| Entertainer of the Year
| 
|-
| "I Was Country When Country Wasn't Cool"
| Single of the Year
| 
|-
| rowspan="2"| 1982
| Barbara Mandrell
| Entertainer of the Year
| 
|-
| Barbara Mandrell
| Top Female Vocalist
| 
|-
| rowspan="2"| 1983
| Barbara Mandrell
| Entertainer of the Year
| 
|-
| Barbara Mandrell
| Top Female Vocalist
| 
|-
| 1984
| Barbara Mandrell and Lee Greenwood
| Top Vocal Duet
| 
|-
| 2000
| Barbara Mandrell
| Cliffie Stone Pioneer Award
| 
|-
| 2005
| Barbara Mandrell
| Triple Crown
| 
|-
|}

American Music Awards

!
|-
| rowspan="2"| 1980
| "Sleeping Single in a Double Bed"
| Favorite Country Song
| 
| align="center"| 
|-
| Barbara Mandrell
| Favorite Country Female Artist
| 
| align="center"| 
|-
| 1981
| Barbara Mandrell
| Favorite Country Female Artist
| 
| align="center" rowspan = "6" | 
|-
| 1982
| Barbara Mandrell
| Favorite Country Female Artist
| 
|-
| 1983
| Barbara Mandrell
| Favorite Country Female Artist
| 
|-
| 1984
| Barbara Mandrell
| Favorite Country Female Artist
| 
|-
| 1985
| Barbara Mandrell
| Favorite Country Female Artist
| 
|-
| 1987
| Barbara Mandrell
| Favorite Country Female Artist
| 
|-
|}

AMG Heritage Awards

!
|-
| rowspan="1"| 2012
| Barbara Mandrell
| AMG Heritage Award for Favorite Retro Artist
| 
| align="center"| 
|-
| rowspan="1"| 2013
| Barbara Mandrell
| AMG Heritage Award for Favorite Retro Artist
| 
|
|-
| rowspan="1"| 2014
| Barbara Mandrell
| AMG Heritage Award for Favorite Retro Artist
| 
|
|-
| rowspan="1"| 2015
| Barbara Mandrell
| AMG Heritage Award for Favorite Retro Artist
| 
|
|-
|}

CMT Music Awards

!
|-
| 1976
| Barbara Mandrell
| Most Promising Female Artist of the Year
| 
| 
|-
| 1979
| Barbara Mandrell
| Female Artist of the Year
| 
| 
|-
| rowspan = "3" | 1981
| Barbara Mandrell
| Comedian of the Year
| 
| 
|-
| Barbara Mandrell
| Female Artist of the Year
| 
| 
|-
| Barbara Mandrell
| Instrumentalist of the Year
| 
| 
|-
| rowspan = "2" | 1982
| Barbara Mandrell
| Female Artist of the Year
| 
| 
|-
| Barbara Mandrell
| Instrumentalist of the Year
| 
|
|-
| 1985
| Barbara Mandrell
| Living Legend Award
| 
| 
|-
| 1991
| Barbara Mandrell
| Minnie Pearl Award
| 
|-
|}

Country Gospel Music Association Hall of Fame

!
|-
| 1998
| Barbara Mandrell
| Inducted
| 
| align="center"| 
|-
|}

Country Music Hall of Fame and Museum

!
|-
| 2009
| Barbara Mandrel
| Inducted
| 
| align="center"| 
|-
|}

Country Music Association Awards

!
|-
| 1973
| David Houston and Barbara Mandrell
| Vocal Duo of the Year
| 
| align="center" rowspan = "21" | 
|-
| 1974
| David Houston and Barbara Mandrell
| Vocal Duo of the Year
| 
|-
| 1976
| Barbara Mandrell
| Female Vocalist of the Year
| 
|-
| 1977
| Barbara Mandrell
| Female Vocalist of the Year
| 
|-
| 1978
| Barbara Mandrell
| Female Vocalist of the Year
| 
|-
| rowspan = "3" | 1979
| Barbara Mandrell
| Female Vocalist of the Year
| 
|-
| Barbara Mandrell
| Entertainer of the Year
| 
|-
| "(If Loving You Is Wrong) I Don't Want to Be Right"
| Single of the Year
| 
|-
| rowspan = "2" | 1980
| Barbara Mandrell
| Entertainer of the Year
| 
|-
| Barbara Mandrell
| Female Vocalist of the Year
| 
|-
| rowspan = "3" | 1981
| Barbara Mandrell
| Entertainer of the Year
| 
|-
| Barbara Mandrell
| Female Vocalist of the Year
| 
|-
| "I Was Country When Country Wasn't Cool"
| Single of the Year
| 
|-
| rowspan = "2" | 1982
| Barbara Mandrell
| Entertainer of the Year
| 
|-
| Barbara Mandrell
| Female Vocalist of the Year
| 
|-
| rowspan = "2" | 1983
| Barbara Mandrell
| Entertainer of the Year
| 
|-
| Barbara Mandrell
| Female Vocalist of the Year
| 
|-
| rowspan = "3" | 1984
| Barbara Mandrell
| Entertainer of the Year
| 
|-
| Barbara Mandrell
| Female Vocalist of the Year
| 
|-
| Barbara Mandrell and Lee Greenwood
| Vocal Duo of the Year
| 
|-
| 1985
| Barbara Mandrell and Lee Greenwood
| Vocal Duo of the Year
| 
|-
|}

Golden Globe Awards

!
|-
| 1981
| Barbara Mandrell & the Mandrell Sisters
| Best Actress in a Television Series, Musical or Comedy
| 
| 
|-
|}

Grammy Awards

!
|-
| 1978
| "After the Lovin'"
| Best Country Vocal Performance, Female
| 
| align="center" rowspan = "11" | 
|-
| 1979
| "Sleeping Single in a Double Bed"
| Best Country Vocal Performance, Female
| 
|-
| 1980
| Just for the Record
| Best Country Vocal Performance, Female
| 
|-
| 1981
| "The Best of Strangers"
| Best Country Vocal Performance, Female
| 
|-
| rowspan = "3" | 1982
| "I Was Country When Country Wasn't Cool"
| Best Country Vocal Performance, Female
| 
|-
| "Instrumental Medley: Mountain Dew / Fireball Mail / Old Joe Clark / Night Train / Uncle Joe's Boogie"
| Best Country Instrumental Performance
| 
|-
| "In My Heart"
| Best Inspirational Performance
| 
|-
| 1983
| He Set My Life to Music
| Best Inspirational Performance
| 
|-
| 1984
| "I'm So Glad I'm Standing Here Today" 
| Best Soul Gospel Performance by a Duo or Group
| 
|-
| 1985
| "To Me" 
| Best Country Performance by a Duo or Group with Vocal
| 
|-
| 1986
| Christmas at Our House
| Best Inspirational Performance
| 
|-
|}

Music City Walk of Fame

!
|-
| 2007
| Barbara Mandrell
| Star on Walk of Fame
| 
| align="center"| 
|-
|}

Musicians Hall of Fame and Museum

!
|-
| 2014
| Barbara Mandrell
| Inducted
| 
| align="center"| 
|-
|}

People's Choice Awards

!
|-
| rowspan = "3" | 1982
| Barbara Mandrell
| Favorite All-Around Female Entertainer
| 
| 
|-
| Barbara Mandrell
| Favorite Female Musical Performer
| 
| 
|-
| Barbara Mandrell
| Favorite Female TV Performer
| 
| 
|-
| 1983
| Barbara Mandrell
| Favorite All-Around Female Entertainer
| 
| 
|-
| 1984
| Barbara Mandrell
| Favorite All-Around Female Entertainer
| 
| 
|-
| rowspan="2"| 1985
| Barbara Mandrell
| Favorite All-Around Female Entertainer
| 
| 
|-
| Barbara Mandrell
| Favorite Female Musical Performer
| 
|  
|-
| 1986
| Barbara Mandrell
| Favorite All-Around Female Entertainer
| 
| 
|-
| 1987
| Barbara Mandrell
| Favorite All-Around Female Entertainer
| 
| 
|-
|}

Southern Gospel Music Association

!
|-
| 2009
| Barbara Mandrell
| James D. Vaughn Impact Award
| 
| align="center"| 
|-
|}

Women of the World

!
|-
| 1992
| Barbara Mandrell
| Woman of the World
| 
|
|-
|}

Notes

References

Mandrell, Barbara